Scalesia helleri is a species of flowering plant in the family Asteraceae. It is endemic to the Galápagos Islands.

References

helleri
Endemic flora of Ecuador
Flora of the Galápagos Islands
Taxonomy articles created by Polbot